This is a list of honorary citizens of Nepal.

List

References 

Nepal
 
+
Nepali nationality law
honorary citizens